A  is a traditional Korean ribbon used to tie up and decorate braided hair. According to the History of Northern Dynasties, maidens of Baekje bound their hair at the back and braided it, while a married woman braided her hair into two plaits and secured them to the crown of her head.

There are several types of  according to purpose, age, and social status.

Gallery

See also

List of Korean clothing

References

Korean words and phrases
Korean headgear
Fashion accessories